Mondonville may refer to:

Mondonville, Haute-Garonne, a commune in southwestern France
Mondonville-Saint-Jean, Eure-et-Loir, a commune in northern France
Jean-Joseph de Mondonville (1711-1772), French violinist and composer